The 2000 Puerto Rican general elections were held in Puerto Rico on 7 November 2000. Sila María Calderón of the Popular Democratic Party (PPD) was elected Governor, whilst the PPD also won a majority of seats in the House of Representatives and the Senate. Voter turnout was between 80% and 82%.

Results

Governor

Resident Commissioner

House of Representatives

Senate

References

2000 elections in the Caribbean
2000
 
Puerto Rico
2000 in Puerto Rico